The Estádio das Antas (officially Estádio do Futebol Clube do Porto) was the third (and longest occupied) stadium of the Portuguese football side FC Porto. It was in use from 1952 to 2004, replacing the earlier Campo da Constituição, 1.6km (1 mile) to the west, and later replaced by the Estádio do Dragão, a block southeast away. As well as the stadium, it had an indoor arena and three training grounds. The club's offices were also split between the inside of the stadium and the Torre das Antas, built in front of the stadium during the 1990s. It was demolished in 2004, although one floodlight still remains, and the majority of the site is not yet redeveloped.

Layout
The stadium was split into six different areas. The Poente and Maratona contained the best seats, while the most financially accessible were located in the Superior Norte, Superior Sul and Arquibancada. Between the Norte and Poente were seats for the away supporters. Each stand was split into different sectors. While the Poente had four, both Maratona and Arquibancada had five, and both Superiores (upper tiers) had nine, but two in Norte were reserved for away supporters. For matches, low turnout from away fans, in contrast to that expected from Porto supporters, so the away fan sector was often reduced in size by half. In the past there were other divisions, such as splitting the Superior stands between the original and the new terraces built after the 1986 capacity increase.

Portugal national football team
The national team first played in the stadium in 1952 and held its last game there in 2003.

Milestones

28 May 1952 – Inaugurated in the presence of Portuguese President General Craveiro Lopes.
1 September 1962 – Floodlights.
1973 – All-purpose arena completed.
30 April 1976 – Construction of Maratona stand, on the opposite of the main stand, and start of the Arquibancada.
16 December 1986 – capacity increased to 95,000 (rebaixamento). (Athletics track removed)
Summer 1997 – All-seater (capacity reduced to 48,297 seats).
24 January 2004 – Final game. Although the successor Estádio do Dragão had opened in November 2003, the replanting of the turf resulted in some games returning to Estádio das Antas.
March 2004 – Demolition began.

External links
Stadium Guide Article

Sports venues completed in 1952
Antas
FC Porto
Sports venues demolished in 2004